Our Ancestors (Italian: I Nostri Antenati) is the name of Italo Calvino's "heraldic trilogy" that comprises The Cloven Viscount (1952), The Baron in the Trees (1957), and The Nonexistent Knight (1959).

Novel series